Willow Koerber (born December 12, 1977) is an American former professional cross-country mountain biker. She most notably finished third at the 2009 and 2010 UCI Cross-country World Championships. She also finished second overall at the 2010 UCI Cross-country World Cup

Koerber is married to Myles Rockwell, a retired professional downhill mountain bike racer and world champion. In 2019, the couple created The Rockwell Ridewell Foundation, a 501(c)(3) organization for youth development.

Major results

2005
 3rd National XCO Championships
2007
 3rd National XCO Championships
2009
 2nd National XCO Championships
 3rd  UCI World XCO Championships
2010
 2nd Overall UCI XCO World Cup
 3rd  UCI World XCO Championships
 3rd National XCO Championships

References

External links

Living people
Downhill mountain bikers
1977 births
American female cyclists
American mountain bikers
Sportspeople from Asheville, North Carolina
21st-century American women